Brian L. Hinman (born August 22, 1961 in Bethesda, Maryland) is an entrepreneur and investor in high technology businesses, especially the computer-based communications industry.

Hinman founded three successful (annual revenues greater than $500 million) high technology companies; PictureTel Corp. (Videoconferencing), Polycom (Conference call), and 2Wire (digital subscriber line).  Both PictureTel Corp. and Polycom had initial public offerings. Hinman and his co-founders took PictureTel public in November 1984, only three months after the company was founded, and two years before the first product was shipped. 2Wire was acquired by set-top box maker Pace  in July, 2010. Technologies where Hinman has been granted patents include video compression and conference calls.

Early life and education
Hinman, the son of Earl E Hinman, Jr and Roberta D. Hinman, grew up primarily in Wheaton, Maryland

Brian received a BSEE from the University of Maryland, College Park in December 1982, and an MSEE from MIT in June 1984.  Hinman later sponsored an entrepreneurship program at University of Maryland, College Park called the "Hinman CEOs".

Career
From 2006 to 2015, Hinman worked at Oak Ventures as a venture partner  where he worked with Cleantech investments such as algae company Aurora Algae  and solar technology companies eSolar and GreenVolts.  Hinman has also been involved with public-private partnerships by buying and funding an underfunded fire station in Los Gatos.

In 2012, Hinman co-founded Mimosa Networks, a gigabit wireless hardware company based in Santa Clara, CA. Hinman served as Co-Founder, CEO and President at Mimosa Networks. In November 2018, Mimosa merged with Airspan Networks, a leader in 5G mobile technologies.

Awards
Brian Hinman received the Ernst & Young Entrepreneur Of The Year Award in 2004 and was a national finalist in 2005. The Ernst & Young Entrepreneur Of The Year© award is the world's most prestigious business award for entrepreneurs, spanning more than 140 cities and 50 countries worldwide.

In 2011, the Rochester Institute of Technology awarded him an honorary doctorate of science.

References

Living people
American venture capitalists
1961 births
People from Bethesda, Maryland
MIT School of Engineering alumni
University of Maryland, College Park alumni